Roderick McKenzie was a New Zealand politician.

Roderick McKenzie may also refer to:

Roderick McKenzie, Canadian fur trader and the cousin of Alexander Mackenzie
Roderick D. McKenzie (1885-1940), American-Canadian sociologist
Roddy McKenzie (born 1975), Scottish footballer (Heart of Midlothian FC, Livingston FC)
Roddy McKenzie (footballer, born 1945), Northern Ireland footballer (Airdrieonians, Hibernian FC, Clydebank FC)
Roderick McKenzie, one of the editors of Liddell and Scott's A Greek–English Lexicon

See also 
Roddie MacKenzie (born 1901), Scottish footballer (Newcastle United FC)